The Holdfast Chronicles is a series of books by American feminist science fiction author Suzy McKee Charnas.

The series consists of four books:
 Walk to the End of the World (1974)
 Motherlines (1978)
 The Furies (1994)
 The Conqueror's Child (1999).

Reception
Salon.com reviewer Polly Shulman declared that "the Holdfast tetralogy offers a fascinating look back at the permutations of the feminist imagination in recent years, and it underlines the ideals and challenges faced by feminists ..."

Awards
The entire series was inducted into the Gaylactic Spectrum Hall of Fame in 2003.
Motherlines and Walk to the End of the World won a retrospective James Tiptree, Jr. Award, and The Conqueror's Child won the award in 1999.

The Furies was nominated for the 1994 Lambda Literary Award for science fiction and fantasy.

References

Sources
 Mohr, Dunja M. Worlds Apart: Dualism and Transgression in Contemporary Female Dystopias. Jefferson, NC, McFarland, 2005. [extensive chapter on the Holdfast series]

External links
 The web site of Suzy McKee Charnas.
 Interview at SFFWorld.com
 

Novel series
1974 American novels
1978 American novels
James Tiptree Jr. Award-winning works
Feminist science fiction
Novels by Suzy McKee Charnas
Single-gender worlds
Science fiction book series
LGBT speculative fiction novels